Batsell Baxter (November 17, 1886 – March 4, 1956) was one of the most important leaders and educators in the Churches of Christ in the first half of the 20th century.

Biography
He received his early education from David Lipscomb and James A. Harding at the Nashville Bible School (now known as Lipscomb University). He also obtained degrees from Abilene Christian College (B.A.), University of Southern California (M.A., Ph.D.), and Vanderbilt University (B.D.).

Baxter served as president of Abilene Christian College (1924-1932), David Lipscomb College (1932-1934, 1943-1946), and George Pepperdine College (1937-1939). These institutions are now called Abilene Christian University, Lipscomb University, and Pepperdine University, respectively. He was also Dean of Cordell Christian College in Oklahoma and Dean of Thorp Spring Christian College (near Fort Worth, Texas). He wrote several books and regularly contributed to the Gospel Advocate, a periodical associated with the Churches of Christ. He also preached for several different Churches of Christ. 
 
Baxter was the father of Batsell Barrett Baxter, who was also a professor and preacher in the Church of Christ.

External links
On-line biography

1886 births
1956 deaths
Abilene Christian University alumni
Lipscomb University alumni
Ministers of the Churches of Christ
Lipscomb University presidents
Presidents of Pepperdine University
University of Southern California alumni
Vanderbilt University alumni